Youthful Indiscretion (German: Jugendsünden) is a 1929 German silent film directed by Carl Heinz Wolff and starring Martin Herzberg, Carola Höhn and Rina Marsa.

The film's sets were designed by Gustav A. Knauer and Willy Schiller.

Cast
 Martin Herzberg 
 Carola Höhn 
 Rina Marsa 
 Erna Morena 
 Henri Peters-Arnolds 
 Fritz Schroeter 
 Margarete Schön 
 Leopold von Ledebur

References

Bibliography
 Alfred Krautz. International directory of cinematographers, set- and costume designers in film, Volume 4. Saur, 1984.

External links
 

1929 films
Films of the Weimar Republic
German silent feature films
Films directed by Carl Heinz Wolff
German black-and-white films